Cratinus the Younger (4th century BC) was a comic poet of the Middle Comedy, and was a contemporary of Plato and of Corydus. He flourished in the middle of 4th century BC, and as late as 324 BC. Some scholars believe that he even lived into the reign of Ptolemy II Philadelphus.

Surviving titles and fragments
Nine titles of his plays have survived:

Many fragments ascribed to the Old Comedy playwright Cratinus were probably by Cratinus the Younger.

References

4th-century BC Athenians
Ancient Greek dramatists and playwrights
Ancient Greek satirists
Middle Comic poets